Live Planetarium is the first live album and fifth release of Australian Christian extreme metal band Mortification, released in 1993. It contains live versions of material from the band's three previously released studio albums, Mortification (1991), Scrolls of the Megilloth (1992), and Post Momentary Affliction (1993), as well as two new songs, "Symbiosis" and "Time Crusaders", and a cover of "Black Snake" by American Christian metal band Bloodgood. A video version of Live Planetarium was released on VHS in 1994 and later on DVD in 2006. A segment on Mortification's history, from the video of Live Planetarium, was included on the Tourniquet/Mortification Collector's Edition CD Single in 1994; the disc also contained songs from Mortification's Blood World album and American Christian metal band Tourniquet's Vanishing Lessons album. A studio recording of "Symbiosis" was included on Blood World. Soundmass released a reissue of Live Planetarium in 2019 on vinyl with new cover art and on CD in 2020 with the studio version of "Time Crusaders" as a bonus track; the track "Black Snake" was removed from the reissues.

Track listing 

Song not included on the 2019 or 2020 reissues.

Personnel 

Mortification
Steve Rowe – vocals, bass guitar
Michael Carlisle – guitar
Jayson Sherlock – drums

Production
Doug Saunders – producer, studio production, location recording, mix engineer
Shaun Kerrigan – assistant engineer, location recording
Doug Doyle – mastering at Digital Brothers in Costa Mesa, California
Neil Johnson – video production, video editing, video direction, cameraman
Additional personnel
Troy Dunmire – cover illustration
Chris Dean – cover design
Kristy Hiller – design, layout (original version)
Matthew Duffy – A&R direction
Thom Roy – art direction
Keith Bannister – photography, roadie
Surfie – live photographer
Sean Moss, Trevor Smith – cameramen
Rehearsals at Jam Tin Studios in Chetelham, Melbourne, Australia
Mixed at Toybox Studios in Northcote, Melbourne, Australia, 11 October 1993 – 20 October 1993
Amber Waters – hand colouring (2019 and 2020 versions)
Scott Waters (Ultimatum) – design, layout (2019 and 2020 versions)

Mortification (band) live albums
1993 live albums
Live death metal albums